Belgian owned and operated aircraft are identified by either registration letters or serial numbers for military aircraft.

Civil aircraft
An aircraft registration is a unique alphanumeric string that identifies a civil aircraft, in similar fashion to a licence plate on an automobile. In accordance with the Convention on International Civil Aviation all aircraft must be registered with a national aviation authority and they must carry proof of this registration in the form of a legal document called a Certificate of Registration at all times when in operation.

1913 allocation
The first use of aircraft registrations was based on the radio callsigns allocated at the London International Radiotelegraphic Conference in 1913. The format was a single letter prefix followed by four other letters (like A-BCDE). The major nations operating aircraft were allocated a single letter prefix but minor countries had to share a single letter prefix but were allocated exclusive use of the first letter of the suffix. Belgium was not considered a major operator of aircraft and was allocated the prefix and first letter suffix O-B. When the conference allocated the same prefix it made sure that they were in different parts of the world, the other user of the O prefix was Peru and they were allocated O-P. The first allocation was O-BEBE to a Fokker D.VII on 1 March 1920.

1928 allocation
Following the allocation of radio callsigns to Belgium of ON, OO, OP, OQ, OR, OS and OT at the 1927 International Radio-Telegraph Conference. The callsign allocation did not align with those allocated for aircraft registrations and in 1928 the International Convention of Air Navigation re-allocated the aircraft registration prefix to align with the callsigns. Belgium could use all or any letter groups that had been allocated as radio callsigns and in 1929 the prefix OO was selected. The first allocation was OO-AJT to a Stampe et Vertongen RSV 26 in March 1929 and the format was still in use in 2011.

Use
Some of the blocks of registrations have had a reserved usage and these include:

OO-BAA to OO-BZZ used mainly for balloons
OO-CAA to OO-CZZ used for the Belgian Congo 1934-1960
OO-YAA to OO-ZZZ used mainly for gliders
OO-01 to OO-499 used for homebuild aircraft

Belgian Congo
The Belgian Government issued registration for civil aircraft used in the Belgian Congo and from April 1934 used OO-CAA to OO-CZZ. The allocation 
ceased in 1960 with independence and the allocation of the prefix 9Q.

Military aircraft

Belgian Air Force
When the Belgian Air Force was re-formed in 1946 individual aircraft were allocated serial numbers in either a one or two letter prefix followed by a one or two digit number. The first allocations were mainly single letters (for example A-1 was an Auster AOP.6) but sometimes a second letter was used to distinguish variants, for example NA-1 was an Avro Anson I and NB-1 was an Anson II.

In the 1950s the first letter started to be used as a role prefix, for example FX-01 was a Lockheed F-104G Starfighter 
classified as a Fighter.

An Aero Commander 560F was operated for royal flights between 1961 and 1973 without a serial number but display its radio callsign OT-CWB instead. Similarly, there have been Douglas C-47B transports "registered" OT-CWA, OT-CWG and OT-CNR, and a Sikorsky S-58 helicopter "registered" OT-ZKP.

Belgian Army
In 1954 the Belgian Army formed its own aviation element and serial numbers were allocated in the form OL-A01, the OL for Observation Leger (light observation), the letter for the type and the number for each individual aircraft. In 1974 the OL prefix was dropped.

Belgian Navy
The Belgian Navy have operated a number of shipborne helicopters which were allocated serials with single letter prefix although the radio callsigns were also painted on the aircraft in a similar format to registrations.

Police
The Belgian Rijkswacht/Gendarmerie and later the Federal Police have operated both fixed-wing aircraft and helicopters which carry serial numbers prefixed G with individual aircraft identified by increasing numbers.  The first was an Aerospatiale Puma registered as G01.

References
Notes

Sources

Serial numbers
Belgian Air Component
Aviation licenses and certifications
Aircraft markings